The history of Hinduism covers a wide variety of related religious traditions native to the Indian subcontinent. It overlaps or coincides with the development of religion in the Indian subcontinent since the Iron Age, with some of its traditions tracing back to prehistoric religions such as those of the Bronze Age Indus Valley Civilisation. It has thus been called the "oldest religion" in the world. Scholars regard Hinduism as a synthesis of various Indian cultures and traditions, with diverse roots and no single founder. This Hindu synthesis emerged after the Vedic period, between ca. 500–200 BCE and ca. 300 CE, in or after the period of the Second Urbanisation, and during the early classical period of Hinduism (200 BCE-300 CE). It flourished in the medieval period, with the decline of Buddhism in India.

The history of Hinduism is often divided into periods of development. The first period is the pre-Vedic period, which includes the Indus Valley Civilization and local pre-historic religions, ending at about 1750 BCE. This period was followed in northern India by the Vedic period, which saw the introduction of the historical Vedic religion with the Indo-Aryan migrations, starting somewhere between 1900 BCE and 1400 BCE. The subsequent period, between 800 BCE and 200 BCE, is "a turning point between the Vedic religion and Hindu religions", and a formative period for Hinduism, Jainism and Buddhism. During the Epic and Early Puranic period, from c. 200 BCE to 500 CE, the Epics and the first Purānas were composed. It was followed by the classical "Golden Age" of Hinduism (c. 320-650 CE), which coincides with the Gupta Empire. In this period the six branches of Hindu philosophy evolved, namely Samkhya, Yoga, Nyaya, Vaisheshika, Mīmāṃsā, and Vedānta. Monotheistic sects like Shaivism and Vaishnavism developed during this same period through the Bhakti movement. The period from roughly 650 to 1100 CE forms the late Classical period or early Middle Ages, in which classical Puranic Hinduism is established, and Adi Shankara's influential consolidation of Advaita Vedanta.

Hinduism under both Hindu and Islamic rulers from c. 1200 to 1750 CE, saw the increasing prominence of the Bhakti movement, which remains influential today. The colonial period saw the emergence of various Hindu reform movements partly inspired by western movements, such as Unitarianism and Theosophy. The Partition of India in 1947 was along religious lines, with the Republic of India emerging with a Hindu majority. During the 20th century, due to the Indian diaspora, Hindu minorities have formed in all continents, with the largest communities in absolute numbers in the United States and the United Kingdom.

Roots of Hinduism 
While the Puranic chronology presents a genealogy of thousands of years, scholars regard Hinduism as a fusion or synthesis of various Indian cultures and traditions.
Among its roots are the historical Vedic religion, itself already the product of "a composite of the Indo-Aryan and Harappan cultures and civilizations", which evolved into the Brahmanical religion and ideology of the Kuru Kingdom of Iron Age northern India; but also the Śramaṇa or renouncer traditions of northeast India, and mesolithic and neolithic cultures of India, such as the religions of the Indus Valley Civilisation, Dravidian traditions, and the local traditions and tribal religions.

This Hindu synthesis emerged after the Vedic period, between 500-200 BCE and c. 300 CE, in the period of the Second Urbanisation and the early classical period of Hinduism, when the Epics and the first Puranas were composed. This Brahmanical synthesis incorporated śramaṇic and Buddhist influences and the emerging bhakti tradition into the Brahmanical fold via the smriti literature. This synthesis emerged under the pressure of the success of Buddhism and Jainism. During the Gupta reign the first Puranas were written, which were used to disseminate "mainstream religious ideology amongst pre-literate and tribal groups undergoing acculturation." The resulting Puranic Hinduism differed markedly from the earlier Brahmanism of the Dharmasutras and the smritis. Hinduism co-existed for several centuries with Buddhism, to finally gain the upper hand at all levels in the 8th century.

From northern India this "Hindu synthesis", and its societal divisions, spread to southern India and parts of Southeast Asia, as courts and rulers adopted the Brahmanical culture. It was aided by the settlement of Brahmins on land granted by local rulers, the incorporation and assimilation of popular non-Vedic gods, and the process of Sanskritization, in which "people from many strata of society throughout the subcontinent tended to adapt their religious and social life to Brahmanic norms". This process of assimilation explains the wide diversity of local cultures in India "half shrouded in a taddered cloak of conceptual unity."

According to Eliot Deutsch, Brahmins played an essential role in the development of this synthesis. They were bilingual and bicultural, speaking both their local language, and popular Sanskrit, which transcended regional differences in culture and language. They were able to "translate the mainstream of the large culture in terms of the village and the culture of the village in terms of the mainstream," thereby integrating the local culture into a larger whole. While vaidikas and, to a lesser degree, smartas, remained faithful to the traditional Vedic lore, a new brahminism arose which composed litanies for the local and regional gods, and became the ministers of these local traditions.

Periodisation 
James Mill (1773–1836), in his The History of British India (1817), distinguished three phases in the history of India, namely Hindu, Muslim and British civilisations. This periodisation has been criticised, for the misconceptions it has given rise to. Another periodisation is the division into "ancient, classical, medieval and modern periods", although this periodization has also received criticism.

Romila Thapar notes that the division of Hindu-Muslim-British periods of Indian history gives too much weight to "ruling dynasties and foreign invasions," neglecting the social-economic history which often showed a strong continuity. The division in Ancient-Medieval-Modern overlooks the fact that the Muslim-conquests took place between the eighth and the fourteenth century, while the south was never completely conquered. According to Thapar, a periodisation could also be based on "significant social and economic changes," which are not strictly related to a change of ruling powers.

Smart and Michaels seem to follow Mill's periodisation, while Flood and Muesse follow the "ancient, classical, medieval and modern periods" periodisation. An elaborate periodisation may be as follows:
 Pre-history and Indus Valley Civilisation (until c. 1750 BCE);
 Vedic period (c. 1750-500 BCE);
 "Second Urbanisation" (c. 600-200 BCE);
 Classical Period (c. 200 BCE-1200 CE);
 Pre-classical period (c. 200 BCE – 300 CE);
 "Golden Age" of India (Gupta Empire) (c. 320–650 CE);
 Late-Classical period (c. 650–1200 CE);
 Medieval Period (c. 1200–1500 CE);
 Early Modern Period (c. 1500–1850);
 Modern period (British Raj and independence) (from c. 1850).

Pre-Vedic religions (until c. 1750 BCE)

Prehistory 
Hinduism may have roots in Mesolithic prehistoric religion, such as evidenced in the rock paintings of Bhimbetka rock shelters, which are about 10,000 years old (c. 8,000 BCE), as well as neolithic times. At least some of these shelters were occupied over 100,000 years ago. Several tribal religions still exist, though their practices may not resemble those of prehistoric religions.

Indus Valley Civilization (c. 3300–1700 BCE) 

Some Indus valley seals show swastikas, which are found in other religions worldwide. Phallic symbols interpreted as the much later Hindu linga have been found in the Harappan remains. Many Indus valley seals show animals. One seal shows a horned figure seated in a posture reminiscent of the Lotus position and surrounded by animals was named by early excavators "Pashupati", an epithet of the later Hindu gods Shiva and Rudra. Writing in 1997, Doris Meth Srinivasan said, "Not too many recent studies continue to call the seal's figure a "Proto-Siva," rejecting thereby Marshall's package of proto-Shiva features, including that of three heads. She interprets what John Marshall interpreted as facial as not human but more bovine, possibly a divine buffalo-man. According to Iravatham Mahadevan, symbols 47 and 48 of his Indus script glossary The Indus Script: Texts, Concordance and Tables (1977), representing seated human-like figures, could describe the South Indian deity Murugan.

In view of the large number of figurines found in the Indus valley, some scholars believe that the Harappan people worshipped a mother goddess symbolizing fertility, a common practice among rural Hindus even today. However, this view has been disputed by S. Clark who sees it as an inadequate explanation of the function and construction of many of the figurines.

There are no religious buildings or evidence of elaborate burials... If there were temples, they have not been identified. However, House – 1 in HR-A area in Mohenjadaro's Lower Town has been identified as a possible temple.

Vedic period (c. 1750–500 BCE) 

The commonly proposed period of earlier Vedic age is dated back to 2nd millennium BCE. Vedism was the sacrificial religion of the early Indo-Aryans, speakers of early Old Indic dialects, ultimately deriving from the Proto-Indo-Iranian peoples of the Bronze Age who lived on the Central Asian steppes.

Origins 

The Vedic period, named after the Vedic religion of the Indo-Aryans of the Kuru Kingdom 1200 BCE–525 BCE, lasted from c. 1750 to 500 BCE. The Indo-Aryans were a branch of the Indo-European language family, which many scholars believe originated in Kurgan culture of the Central Asian steppes. Indeed, the Vedic religion, including the names of certain deities, was in essence a branch of the same religious tradition as the ancient Greeks, Romans, Persians, and Germanic peoples. For example, the Vedic god Dyaus is a variant of the Proto-Indo-European god *Dyēus ph2ter (or simply *Dyēus), from which also derive the Greek Zeus and the Roman Jupiter. Similarly the Vedic Manu and Yama derive from the Proto-Indo-European *Manu and *Yemo, from which also derive the Germanic Mannus and Ymir.

According to the Indo-European migration theory, the Indo-Iranians were the common ancestor of the Indo-Aryans and the Proto-Iranians. The Indo-Iranians split into the Indo-Aryans and Iranians around 1800-1600 BC.

The Indo-Aryans were pastoralists who migrated into north-western India after the collapse of the Indus Valley Civilization, The Indo-Aryans were a branch of the Indo-Iranians, which originated in the Andronovo culture in the Bactria-Margiana era, in present northern Afghanistan. The roots of this culture go back further to the Sintashta culture, with funeral sacrifices which show close parallels to the sacrificial funeral rites of the Rigveda.

Although some early depictions of deities seem to appear in the art of the Indus Valley Civilisation, very few religious artifacts from the period corresponding to the Indo-Aryan migration during the Vedic period remains. It has been suggested that the early Vedic religion focused exclusively on the worship of purely "elementary forces of nature by means of elaborate sacrifices", which did not lend themselves easily to anthropomorphological representations. Various artefacts may belong to the Copper Hoard culture (2nd millennium CE), some of them suggesting anthropomorphological characteristics. Interpretations vary as to the exact signification of these artifacts, or even the culture and the periodization to which they belonged.

During the Early Vedic period (c. 1500 – 1100 BCE) Indo-Aryan tribes were pastoralists in north-west India. After 1100 BCE, with the introduction of iron, the Indo-Aryan tribes moved into the western Ganges Plain, adapting an agrarian lifestyle. Rudimentary state-forms appeared, of which the Kuru-tribe and realm was the most influential. It was a tribal union, which developed into the first recorded state-level society in South Asia around 1000 BCE. It decisively changed their religious heritage of the early Vedic period, collecting their ritual hymns into the Veda-collections, and developing new rituals which gained their position in Indian civilization as the orthodox Śrauta rituals, which contributed to the so-called "classical synthesis" or "Hindu synthesis".

Rigvedic religion 

The Indo-Aryans brought with them their language and religion. The Indo-Aryan and Vedic beliefs and practices of the pre-classical era were closely related to the hypothesised Proto-Indo-European religion, and the Indo-Iranian religion. According to Anthony, the Old Indic religion probably emerged among Indo-European immigrants in the contact zone between the Zeravshan River (present-day Uzbekistan) and (present-day) Iran. It was "a syncretic mixture of old Central Asian and new Indo-European elements", which borrowed "distinctive religious beliefs and practices" from the Bactria–Margiana culture. At least 383 non-Indo-European words were borrowed from this culture, including the god Indra and the ritual drink Soma. According to Anthony,

The oldest inscriptions in Old Indic, the language of the Rig Veda, are found not in northwestern India and Pakistan, but in northern Syria, the location of the Mitanni kingdom. The Mitanni kings took Old Indic throne names, and Old Indic technical terms were used for horse-riding and chariot-driving. The Old Indic term r'ta, meaning "cosmic order and truth", the central concept of the Rig Veda, was also employed in the Mitanni kingdom. And Old Indic gods, including Indra, were also known in the Mitanni kingdom.

Their religion was further developed when they migrated into the Ganges Plain after c. 1100 BCE and became settled farmers, further syncretising with the native cultures of northern India. The Vedic religion of the later Vedic period co-existed with local religions, such as the Yaksha cults, and was itself the product of "a composite of the Indo-Aryan and Harappan cultures and civilizations". David Gordon White cites three other mainstream scholars who "have emphatically demonstrated" that Vedic religion is partially derived from the Indus Valley Civilisation.

Vedas 

Its liturgy is preserved in the three Vedic Samhitas: the Rigveda, Samaveda and the Yajurveda. The Vedic texts were the texts of the elite, and do not necessarily represent popular ideas or practices. Of these, the Rig-Veda is the oldest, a collection of hymns composed between ca. 1500-1200 BCE. The other two add ceremonial detail for the performance of the actual sacrifice. The Atharvaveda may also contain compositions dating to before 1000 BCE. It contains material pertinent to domestic ritual and folk magic of the period.

These texts, as well as the voluminous commentary on orthopraxy collected in the Brahmanas compiled during the early 1st millennium BCE, were transmitted by oral tradition alone until the advent, in the 4th century AD, of the Pallava and Gupta period and by a combination of written and oral tradition since then.

The Hindu samskaras

The earliest text of the Vedas is the Rigveda, a collection of poetic hymns used in the sacrificial rites of Vedic priesthood. Many Rigvedic hymns concern the fire ritual (Agnihotra) and especially the offering of Soma to the gods (Somayajna). Soma is both an intoxicant and a god itself, as is the sacrificial fire, Agni. The royal horse sacrifice (Ashvamedha) is a central rite in the Yajurveda.

The gods in the Rig-Veda are mostly personified concepts, who fall into two categories: the devas – who were gods of nature – such as the weather deity Indra (who is also the King of the gods), Agni ("fire"), Usha ("dawn"), Surya ("sun") and Apas ("waters") on the one hand, and on the other hand the asuras – gods of moral concepts – such as Mitra ("contract"), Aryaman (guardian of guest, friendship and marriage), Bhaga ("share") or Varuna, the supreme Asura (or Aditya). While Rigvedic deva is variously applied to most gods, including many of the Asuras, the Devas are characterised as Younger Gods while Asuras are the Older Gods (pūrve devāḥ). In later Vedic texts, "Asura" comes to mean demon.

The Rigveda has 10 Mandalas ('books'). There is significant variation in the language and style between the family books (RV books 2–7), book 8, the "Soma Mandala" (RV 9), and the more recent books 1 and 10. The older books share many aspects of common Indo-Iranian religion, and is an important source for the reconstruction of earlier common Indo-European traditions. Especially RV 8 has striking similarity to the Avesta, containing allusions to Afghan Flora and Fauna, e.g. to camels ( = Avestan uštra). Many of the central religious terms in Vedic Sanskrit have cognates in the religious vocabulary of other Indo-European languages (deva: Latin deus; hotar: Germanic god; asura: Germanic ansuz; yajna: Greek hagios; brahman: Norse Bragi or perhaps Latin flamen etc.). In the Avesta, Asura (Ahura) is considered good and Devas (Daevas) are considered evil entities, quite the opposite of the Rig Veda.

Cosmic order 
Ethics in the Vedas are based on the concepts of Satya and Ṛta. Satya is the principle of integration rooted in the Absolute. Ṛta is the expression of Satya, which regulates and coordinates the operation of the universe and everything within it. Conformity with Ṛta would enable progress whereas its violation would lead to punishment. Panikkar remarks:

The term "dharma" was already used in Brahmanical thought, where it was conceived as an aspect of Rta. The term rta is also known from the Proto-Indo-Iranian religion, the religion of the Indo-Iranian peoples prior to the earliest Vedic (Indo-Aryan) and Zoroastrian (Iranian) scriptures. Asha (aša) is the Avestan language term corresponding to Vedic language ṛta.

Upanishads 

The 9th and 8th centuries BCE witnessed the composition of the earliest Upanishads. Upanishads form the theoretical basis of classical Hinduism and are known as Vedanta (conclusion of the Veda). The older Upanishads launched attacks of increasing intensity on the rituals, however, a philosophical and allegorical meaning is also given to these rituals. In some later Upanishads there is a spirit of accommodation towards rituals. The tendency which appears in the philosophical hymns of the Vedas to reduce the number of gods to one principle becomes prominent in the Upanishads. The diverse monistic speculations of the Upanishads were synthesised into a theistic framework by the sacred Hindu scripture Bhagavad Gita.

Brahmanism 

Brahmanism, also called Brahminism, developed out of the Vedic religion, incorporating non-Vedic religious ideas, and expanding to a region stretching from the northwest Indian subcontinent to the Ganges valley. Brahmanism included the Vedic corpus, but also post-Vedic texts such as the Dharmasutras and Dharmasastras, which gave prominence to the priestly (Brahmin) class of the society. The emphasis on ritual and the dominant position of Brahmans developed as an ideology developed in the Kuru-Pancala realm, and expanded into a wider realm after the demise of the Kuru-Pancala realm. It co-existed with local religions, such as the Yaksha cults.

In Iron Age India, during a period roughly spanning the 10th to 6th centuries BCE, the Mahajanapadas arise from the earlier kingdoms of the various Indo-Aryan tribes, and the remnants of the Late Harappan culture. In this period the mantra portions of the Vedas are largely completed, and a flowering industry of Vedic priesthood organised in numerous schools (shakha) develops exegetical literature, viz. the Brahmanas. These schools also edited the Vedic mantra portions into fixed recensions, that were to be preserved purely by oral tradition over the following two millennia.

Second Urbanisation and decline of Brahmanism (c. 600–200 BCE)

Upanishads and Śramaṇa movements 

Vedism, with its orthodox rituals, may have been challenged as a consequence of the increasing urbanisation of India in the 7th and 6th centuries BCE, and the influx of foreign stimuli initiated with the Achaemenid conquest of the Indus Valley (circa 535 BCE). New ascetic or sramana movements arose, which challenged established religious orthodoxy, such as Buddhism, Jainism and local popular cults. The anthropomorphic depiction of various deities apparently resumed in the middle of the 1st millennium BCE, also as the consequence of the reduced authority of Vedism.

Mahavira (c. 549–477 BCE), proponent of Jainism, and Buddha (c. 563-483 BCE), founder of Buddhism, were the most prominent icons of this movement. According to Heinrich Zimmer, Jainism and Buddhism are part of the pre-Vedic heritage, which also includes Samkhya and Yoga:

The Sramana tradition in part created the concept of the cycle of birth and death, the concept of Saṃsāra, and the concept of liberation, which became characteristic for Hinduism.

Pratt notes that Oldenberg (1854–1920), Neumann (1865–1915) and Radhakrishnan (1888–1975) believed that the Buddhist canon had been influenced by Upanishads, while la Vallee Poussin thinks the influence was nihil, and "Eliot and several others insist that on some points the Buddha was directly antithetical to the Upanishads".

Mauryan Empire 

The Mauryan period saw an early flowering of classical Sanskrit Sutra and Shastra literature and the scholarly exposition of the "circum-Vedic" fields of the Vedanga. However, during this time Buddhism was patronised by Ashoka, who ruled large parts of India, and Buddhism was also the mainstream religion until the Gupta period.

Decline of Brahmanism

Decline 

The post-Vedic period of the Second Urbanisation saw a decline of Brahmanism. At the end of the Vedic period, the meaning of the words of the Vedas had become obscure, and was perceived as "a fixed sequence of sounds" with a magical power, "means to an end." With the growth of cities, which threatened the income and patronage of the rural Brahmins; the rise of Buddhism; and the Indian campaign of Alexander the Great (327-325 BCE), the expansion of the Maurya Empire (322-185 BCE) with its embrace of Buddhism, and the Saka invasions and rule of northwestern India (2nd c. BC – 4th c. CE), Brahmanism faced a grave threat to its existence. In some later texts, Northwest-India (which earlier texts consider as part of "Aryavarta") is even seen as "impure", probably due to invasions.

Survival of Vedic ritual 

Vedism as the religious tradition of a priestly elite was marginalised by other traditions such as Jainism and Buddhism in the later Iron Age, but in the Middle Ages would rise to renewed prestige with the Mimamsa school, which as well as all other astika traditions of Hinduism, considered them authorless (apaurusheyatva) and eternal. A last surviving elements of the Historical Vedic religion or Vedism is Śrauta tradition, following many major elements of Vedic religion and is prominent in South India, with communities in Tamil Nadu, Kerala, Karnataka, Andhra Pradesh, but also in some pockets of Uttar Pradesh, Maharashtra and other states; the best known of these groups are the Nambudiri of Kerala, whose traditions were notably documented by Frits Staal.

Hindu synthesis and Classical Hinduism (c. 200 BCE – 1200 CE)

Early Hinduism (c. 200 BCE – 320 CE)

Hindu synthesis 

The decline of Brahmanism was overcome by providing new services and incorporating the non-Vedic Indo-Aryan religious heritage of the eastern Ganges plain and local religious traditions, giving rise to contemporary Hinduism. Between 500–200 BCE and c. 300 CE the "Hindu synthesis" developed, which incorporated Sramanic and Buddhist influences and the emerging Bhakti tradition into the Brahmanical fold via the smriti literature. This synthesis emerged under the pressure of the success of Buddhism and Jainism.

According to Embree, several other religious traditions had existed side by side with the Vedic religion. These indigenous religions "eventually found a place under the broad mantle of the Vedic religion". When Brahmanism was declining and had to compete with Buddhism and Jainism, the popular religions had the opportunity to assert themselves. According to Embree,

This "new Brahmanism" appealed to rulers, who were attracted to the supernatural powers and the practical advice Brahmins could provide, and resulted in a resurgence of Brahmanical influence, dominating Indian society since the classical Age of Hinduism in the early centuries CE. It is reflected in the process of Sanskritization, a process in which "people from many strata of society throughout the subcontinent tended to adapt their religious and social life to Brahmanic norms". It is reflected in the tendency to identify local deities with the gods of the Sanskrit texts.

Smriti 
The Brahmins response of assimilation and consolidation is reflected in the smriti literature which took shape in this period. The smriti texts of the period between 200 BCE and 100 CE proclaim the authority of the Vedas, and acceptance of the Vedas became a central criterium for defining Hinduism over and against the heterodoxies, which rejected the Vedas. Most of the basic ideas and practices of classical Hinduism derive from the new smriti literature.

Of the six Hindu darsanas, the Mimamsa and the Vedanta "are rooted primarily in the Vedic sruti tradition and are sometimes called smarta schools in the sense that they develop smarta orthodox current of thoughts that are based, like smriti, directly on sruti". According to Hiltebeitel, "the consolidation of Hinduism takes place under the sign of bhakti". It is the Bhagavadgita that seals this achievement. The result is a "universal achievement" that may be called smarta. It views Shiva and Vishnu as "complementary in their functions but ontologically identical".

The major Sanskrit epics, Ramayana and Mahabharata, which belong to the smriti, were compiled over a protracted period during the late centuries BCE and the early centuries CE. They contain mythological stories about the rulers and wars of ancient India, and are interspersed with religious and philosophical treatises. The later Puranas recount tales about devas and devis, their interactions with humans and their battles against rakshasa. The Bhagavad Gita "seals the achievement" of the "consolidation of Hinduism", integrating Brahmanic and sramanic ideas with theistic devotion.

Schools of Hindu philosophy 
In early centuries CE several schools of Hindu philosophy were formally codified, including Samkhya, Yoga, Nyaya, Vaisheshika, Purva-Mimamsa and Vedanta.

Sangam literature 
The Sangam literature (300 BCE – 400 CE), written in the Sangam period, is a mostly secular body of classical literature in the Tamil language. Nonetheless, there are some works, significantly Pattupathu and Paripaatal, wherein the personal devotion to God was written in the form of devotional poems. Vishnu, Shiva and Murugan were mentioned gods. These works are therefore the earliest evidence of monotheistic Bhakti traditions, preceding the large bhakti movement, which was given great attention in later times.

Indian trade with Africa 
During the time of the Roman Empire, trade took place between India and east Africa, and there is archaeological evidence of small Indian presence in Zanzibar, Zimbabwe, Madagascar, and the coastal parts of Kenya along with the Swahili coast, but no conversion to Hinduism took place.

Hindu Colony in the Middle East (The Levant) 
Armenian historian Zenob Glak (300-350 CE) said "there was an Indian colony in the canton of Taron on the upper Euphrates, to the west of Lake Van, as early as the second century B.C. The Indians had built there two temples containing images of gods about 18 and 22 feet high."

"Golden Age" of India (Gupta and Pallava period) (c. 320–650 CE) 

During this period, power was centralised, along with a growth of near distance trade, standardization of legal procedures, and general spread of literacy. Mahayana Buddhism flourished, but orthodox Brahmana culture began to be rejuvenated by the patronage of the Gupta Dynasty, who were Vaishnavas. The position of the Brahmans was reinforced, the first Hindu temples dedicated to the gods of the Hindu deities, emerged during the late Gupta age. During the Gupta reign the first Puranas were written, which were used to disseminate "mainstream religious ideology amongst pre-literate and tribal groups undergoing acculturation". The Guptas patronised the newly emerging Puranic religion, seeking legitimacy for their dynasty. The resulting Puranic Hinduism, differed markedly from the earlier Brahmanism of the Dharmasastras and the smritis.

According to P. S. Sharma, "the Gupta and Harsha periods form really, from the strictly intellectual standpoint, the most brilliant epocha in the development of Indian philosophy", as Hindu and Buddhist philosophies flourished side by side. Charvaka, the atheistic materialist school, came to the fore in North India before the 8th century CE.

Gupta and Pallava Empires 

The Gupta period (4th to 6th centuries) saw a flowering of scholarship, the emergence of the classical schools of Hindu philosophy, and of classical Sanskrit literature in general on topics ranging from medicine, veterinary science, mathematics, to astrology and astronomy and astrophysics. The famous Aryabhata and Varāhamihira belong to this age. The Gupta established a strong central government which also allowed a degree of local control. Gupta society was ordered in accordance with Hindu beliefs. This included a strict caste system, or class system. The peace and prosperity created under Gupta leadership enabled the pursuit of scientific and artistic endeavors.

The Pallavas (4th to 9th centuries) were, alongside the Guptas of the North, patronisers of Sanskrit in the South of the Indian subcontinent. The Pallava reign saw the first Sanskrit inscriptions in a script called Grantha. The Pallavas used Dravidian architecture to build some very important Hindu temples and academies in Mahabalipuram, Kanchipuram and other places; their rule saw the rise of great poets, who are as famous as Kalidasa.

During early Pallavas period, there are different connexions to Southeast Asian and other countries. Due to it, in the Middle Ages, Hinduism became the state religion in many kingdoms of Asia, the so-called Greater India—from Afghanistan (Kabul) in the West and including almost all of Southeast Asia in the East (Cambodia, Vietnam, Indonesia, Philippines)—and only by the 15th century was near everywhere supplanted by Buddhism and Islam.

The practice of dedicating temples to different deities came into vogue followed by fine artistic temple architecture and sculpture (see Vastu shastra).

Bhakti 
This period saw the emergence of the Bhakti movement. The Bhakti movement was a rapid growth of bhakti beginning in Tamil Nadu in Southern India with the Saiva Nayanars (4th to 10th centuries CE) and the Vaisnava Alvars (3rd to 9th centuries CE) who spread bhakti poetry and devotion throughout India by the 12th to 18th centuries CE.

Expansion in South-East Asia 

Hindu influences reached the Indonesian Archipelago as early as the first century. At this time, India started to strongly influence Southeast Asian countries. Trade routes linked India with southern Burma, central and southern Siam, lower Cambodia and southern Vietnam and numerous urbanised coastal settlements were established there.

For more than a thousand years, Indian Hindu/Buddhist influence was, therefore, the major factor that brought a certain level of cultural unity to the various countries of the region. The Pali and Sanskrit languages and the Indian script, together with Theravada and Mahayana Buddhism, Brahmanism and Hinduism, were transmitted from direct contact as well as through sacred texts and Indian literature, such as the Ramayana and the Mahabharata epics.

From the 5th to the 13th century, South-East Asia had very powerful Indian colonial empires and became extremely active in Hindu and Buddhist architectural and artistic creation. The Sri Vijaya Empire to the south and the Khmer Empire to the north competed for influence.

Langkasuka (-langkha Sanskrit for "resplendent land" -sukkha of "bliss") was an ancient Hindu kingdom located in the Malay Peninsula. The kingdom, along with Old Kedah settlement, are probably the earliest territorial footholds founded on the Malay Peninsula. According to tradition, the founding of the kingdom happened in the 2nd century; Malay legends claim that Langkasuka was founded at Kedah, and later moved to Pattani.

From the 5th to 15th centuries Sri Vijayan empire, a maritime empire centred on the island of Sumatra in Indonesia, had adopted Mahayana and Vajrayana Buddhism under a line of rulers named the Sailendras. The Empire of Sri Vijaya declined due to conflicts with the Chola rulers of India. The Majapahit Empire succeeded the Singhasari empire. It was one of the last and greatest Hindu empires in maritime Southeast Asia.

Funan was a pre-Angkor Cambodian kingdom, located around the Mekong delta, probably established by Mon-Khmer settlers speaking an Austroasiatic language. According to reports by two Chinese envoys, K'ang T'ai and Chu Ying, the state was established by an Indian Brahmin named Kaundinya, who in the 1st century CE was given instruction in a dream to take a magic bow from a temple and defeat a Khmer queen, Soma. Soma, the daughter of the king of the Nagas, married Kaundinya and their lineage became the royal dynasty of Funan. The myth had the advantage of providing the legitimacy of both an Indian Brahmin and the divinity of the cobras, who at that time were held in religious regard by the inhabitants of the region.

The kingdom of Champa (or Lin-yi in Chinese records) controlled what is now south and central Vietnam from approximately 192 through 1697. The dominant religion of the Cham people was Hinduism and the culture was heavily influenced by India.

Later, from the 9th to the 13th century, the Mahayana Buddhist and Hindu Khmer Empire dominated much of the South-East Asian peninsula. Under the Khmer, more than 900 temples were built in Cambodia and in neighboring Thailand. Angkor was at the centre of this development, with a temple complex and urban organisation able to support around one million urban dwellers. The largest temple complex of the world, Angkor Wat, stands here; built by the king Vishnuvardhan.

Late-Classical Hinduism – Puranic Hinduism (c. 650–1200 CE) 

After the end of the Gupta Empire and the collapse of the Harsha Empire, power became decentralised in India. Several larger kingdoms emerged, with "countless vasal states". The kingdoms were ruled via a feudal system. Smaller kingdoms were dependent on the protection of the larger kingdoms. "The great king was remote, was exalted and deified", as reflected in the Tantric Mandala, which could also depict the king as the centre of the mandala.

The disintegration of central power also lead to regionalisation of religiosity, and religious rivalry. Local cults and languages were enhanced, and the influence of "Brahmanic ritualistic Hinduism" was diminished. Rural and devotional movements arose, along with Shaivism, Vaisnavism, Bhakti and Tantra, though "sectarian groupings were only at the beginning of their development". Religious movements had to compete for recognition by the local lords. Buddhism lost its position after the 8th century, and began to disappear in India. This was reflected in the change of puja-ceremonies at the courts in the 8th century, where Hindu gods replaced the Buddha as the "supreme, imperial deity".

Puranic Hinduism 

The Brahmanism of the Dharmaśāstra and the smritis underwent a radical transformation at the hands of the Purana composers, resulting in the rise of Puranic Hinduism, "which like a colossus striding across the religious firmanent soon came to overshadow all existing religions". Puranic Hinduism was a "multiplex belief-system which grew and expanded as it absorbed and synthesised polaristic ideas and cultic traditions". It was distinguished from its Vedic Smarta roots by its popular base, its theological and sectarian pluralism, its Tantric veneer, and the central place of bhakti.

The early mediaeval Puranas were composed to disseminate religious mainstream ideology among the pre-literate tribal societies undergoing acculturation. With the breakdown of the Gupta empire, gifts of virgin waste-land were heaped on brahmanas, to ensure profitable agrarian exploitation of land owned by the kings, but also to provide status to the new ruling classes. Brahmanas spread further over India, interacting with local clans with different religions and ideologies. The Brahmanas used the Puranas to incorporate those clans into the agrarian society and its accompanying religion and ideology. According to Flood, "[t]he Brahmans who followed the puranic religion became known as smarta, those whose worship was based on the smriti, or pauranika, those based on the Puranas." Local chiefs and peasants were absorbed into the varna, which was used to keep "control over the new kshatriyas and shudras."

The Brahmanic group was enlarged by incorporating local subgroups, such as local priests. This also lead to stratification within the Brahmins, with some Brahmins having a lower status than other Brahmins. The use of caste worked better with the new Puranic Hinduism than with the Sramanic sects. The Puranic texts provided extensive genealogies which gave status to the new kshatriyas. Buddhist myths pictured government as a contract between an elected ruler and the people. And the Buddhist chakkavatti "was a distinct concept from the models of conquest held up to the kshatriyas and the Rajputs".

Many local religions and traditions were assimilated into puranic Hinduism. Vishnu and Shiva emerged as the main deities, together with Sakti/Deva. Vishnu subsumed the cults of Narayana, Jagannaths, Venkateswara "and many others". Nath:

The transformation of Brahmanism into Pauranic Hinduism in post-Gupta India was due to a process of acculturation. The Puranas helped establish a religious mainstream among the pre-literate tribal societies undergoing acculturation. The tenets of Brahmanism and of the Dharmashastras underwent a radical transformation at the hands of the Purana composers, resulting in the rise of a mainstream "Hinduism" that overshadowed all earlier traditions.

Bhakti movement 

Rama and Krishna became the focus of a strong bhakti tradition, which found expression particularly in the Bhagavata Purana. The Krishna tradition subsumed numerous Naga, yaksa and hill and tree-based cults. Siva absorbed local cults by the suffixing of Isa or Isvara to the name of the local deity, for example, Bhutesvara, Hatakesvara, Chandesvara. In 8th-century royal circles, the Buddha started to be replaced by Hindu gods in pujas. This also was the same period of time the Buddha was made into an avatar of Vishnu.

The first documented bhakti movement was founded by Karaikkal Ammaiyar. She wrote poems in Tamil about her love for Shiva and probably lived around the 6th century CE. The twelve Alvars who were Vaishnavite devotees and the sixty-three Nayanars who were Shaivite devotees nurtured the incipient bhakti movement in Tamil Nadu.

During the 12th century CE in Karnataka, the Bhakti movement took the form of the Virashaiva movement. It was inspired by Basavanna, a Hindu reformer who created the sect of Lingayats or Shiva bhaktas. During this time, a unique and native form of Kannada literature-poetry called Vachanas was born.

Advaita Vedanta 

The early Advaitin Gaudapada (6th-7th c. CE) was influenced by Buddhism. Gaudapda took over the Buddhist doctrines that ultimate reality is pure consciousness (vijñapti-mātra) and "that the nature of the world is the four-cornered negation". Gaudapada "wove [both doctrines] into a philosophy of the Mandukya Upanishad, which was further developed by Shankara". Gaudapada also took over the Buddhist concept of "ajāta" from Nagarjuna's Madhyamaka philosophy. Shankara succeeded in reading Gaudapada's mayavada into Badarayana's Brahma Sutras, "and give it a locus classicus", against the realistic strain of the Brahma Sutras.

Shankara (8th century CE) was a scholar who synthesized and systematized Advaita Vedanta views which already existed at his lifetime. Shankara propounded a unified reality, in which the innermost self of a person (atman) and the supernatural power of the entire world (brahman) are one and the same. Perceiving the changing multiplicity of forms and objects as the final reality is regarded as maya, "illusion," obscuring the unchanging ultimate reality of brahman.

While Shankara has an unparalleled status in the history of Advaita Vedanta, Shankara's early influence in India is doubtful. Until the 11th century, Vedanta itself was a peripheral school of thought, and until the 10th century Shankara himself was overshadowed by his older contemporary Maṇḍana Miśra, who was considered to be the major representative of Advaita.

Several scholars suggest that the historical fame and cultural influence of Shankara and Advaita Vedanta grew only centuries later, during the era of the Muslim invasions and consequent devastation of India, due to the efforts of Vidyaranya (14th c.), who created legends to turn Shankara into a "divine folk-hero who spread his teaching through his digvijaya ("universal conquest") all over India like a victorious conqueror."

Shankara's position was further established in the 19th an 20th-century, when neo-Vedantins and western Orientalists elevated Advaita Vedanta "as the connecting theological thread that united Hinduism into a single religious tradition." Advaita Vedanta has acquired a broad acceptance in Indian culture and beyond as the paradigmatic example of Hindu spirituality, Shankara became "an iconic representation of Hindu religion and culture," despite the fact that most Hindus do not adhere to Advaita Vedanta.

Contact with Persia and Mesopotamia 

Hindu and also Buddhist religious and secular learning had first reached Persia in an organised manner in the 6th century, when the Sassanid Emperor Khosrow I (531–579) deputed Borzuya the physician as his envoy, to invite Indian and Chinese scholars to the Academy of Gondishapur. Burzoe had translated the Sanskrit Panchatantra. His Pahlavi version was translated into Arabic by Ibn al-Muqaffa' under the title of Kalila and Dimna or The Fables of Bidpai.

Under the Abbasid caliphate, Baghdad had replaced Gundeshapur as the most important centre of learning in the then vast Islamic Empire, wherein the traditions, as well as scholars of the latter, flourished. Hindu scholars were invited to the conferences on sciences and mathematics held in Baghdad.

Medieval and early modern periods (c. 1200–1850 CE)

Muslim rule 

Though Islam came to the Indian subcontinent in the early 7th century with the advent of Arab traders, it started impacting Indian religions after the 10th century, and particularly after the 12th century with the establishment and then expansion of Islamic rule. Will Durant calls the Muslim conquest of India "probably the bloodiest story in history". During this period, Buddhism declined rapidly while Hinduism faced military-led and Sultanates-sponsored religious violence. There was a widespread practice of raids, seizure and enslavement of families of Hindus, who were then sold in Sultanate cities or exported to Central Asia. Some texts suggest a number of Hindus were forcibly converted to Islam. Starting with the 13th century, for a period of some 500 years, very few texts, from the numerous written by Muslim court historians, mention any "voluntary conversions of Hindus to Islam", suggesting the insignificance and perhaps rarity of such conversions. Typically enslaved Hindus converted to Islam to gain their freedom. There were occasional exceptions to religious violence against Hinduism. Akbar, for example, recognized Hinduism, banned enslavement of the families of Hindu war captives, protected Hindu temples, and abolished discriminatory Jizya (head taxes) against Hindus. However, many Muslim rulers of Delhi Sultanate and Mughal Empire, before and after Akbar, from the 12th to 18th centuries, destroyed Hindu temples and persecuted non-Muslims. As noted by Alain Daniélou:

Bhakti Vedanta 
Teachers such as Ramanuja, Madhva, and Chaitanya aligned the Bhakti movement with the textual tradition of Vedanta, which until the 11th century was only a peripheral school of thought, while rejecting and opposing the abstract notions of Advaita. Instead, they promoted emotional, passionate devotion towards the more accessible Avatars, especially Krishna and Rama.

Unifying Hinduism 
According to Nicholson, already between the 12th and the 16th century, "certain thinkers began to treat as a single whole the diverse philosophical teachings of the Upanishads, epics, Puranas, and the schools known retrospectively as the 'six systems' (saddarsana) of mainstream Hindu philosophy." Michaels notes that a historicization emerged which preceded later nationalism, articulating ideas which glorified Hinduism and the past.

Several scholars suggest that the historical fame and cultural influence of Shankara and Advaita Vedanta was inetentionally established during this period. Vidyaranya (14th c.), also known as Madhava and a follower of Shankara, created legends to turn Shankara, whose elevated philosophy had no appeal to gain widespread popularity, into a "divine folk-hero who spread his teaching through his digvijaya ("universal conquest") all over India like a victorious conqueror." In his Savadarsanasamgraha ("Summary of all views") Vidyaranya presented Shankara's teachings as the summit of all darsanas, presenting the other darsanas as partial truths which converged in Shankara's teachings. Vidyaranya enjoyed royal support, and his sponsorship and methodical efforts helped establish Shankara as a rallying symbol of values, spread historical and cultural influence of Shankara's Vedānta philosophies, and establish monasteries (mathas) to expand the cultural influence of Shankara and Advaita Vedānta.

Eastern Ganga and Surya States 

Eastern Ganga and Surya were Hindu polities, which ruled much of present-day Odisha (historically known as Kalinga) from the 11th century until the mid-16th century CE. During the 13th and 14th centuries, when large parts of India were under the rule of Muslim powers, an independent Kalinga became a stronghold of Hindu religion, philosophy, art, and architecture. The Eastern Ganga rulers were great patrons of religion and the arts, and the temples they built are considered among the masterpieces of Hindu architecture.

Early Modern period (c. 1500–1850 CE) 
The fall of Vijayanagara Empire to Muslim rulers had marked the end of Hindu imperial defences in the Deccan. But, taking advantage of an over-stretched Mughal Empire (1526–1857), Hinduism once again rose to political prestige, under the Maratha Empire, from 1674 to 1818.

Vijayanagara Empire 
The Vijayanagara Empire was established in 1336 by Harihara I and his brother Bukka Raya I of Sangama dynasty, which originated as a political heir of the Hoysala Empire, Kakatiya Empire, and the Pandyan Empire. The empire rose to prominence as a culmination of attempts by the south Indian powers to ward off Islamic invasions by the end of the 13th century. According to one narrative, the empire's founders Harihara I and Bukka Raya I were two brothers in the service of the Kampili chief. After Kampili fell to the Muslim invasion, they were taken to Delhi and converted to Islam. They were sent back to Kampili as the Delhi Sultan's vassals. After gaining power in the region, they approached Vidyaranya, who converted them back to the Hindu faith.

The Vijayanagara Emperors were tolerant of all religions and sects, as writings by foreign visitors show. The kings used titles such as Gobrahamana Pratipalanacharya (literally, "protector of cows and Brahmins") and Hindurayasuratrana (lit. "upholder of Hindu faith") that testified to their intention of protecting Hinduism and yet were at the same time staunchly Islamicate in their court ceremonials and dress. The empire's founders, Harihara I and Bukka Raya I, were devout Shaivas (worshippers of Shiva), but made grants to the Vaishnava order of Sringeri with Vidyaranya as their patron saint, and designated Varaha (the boar, an avatar of Vishnu) as their emblem. Over one-fourth of the archaeological dig found an "Islamic Quarter" not far from the "Royal Quarter". Nobles from Central Asia's Timurid kingdoms also came to Vijayanagara. The later Saluva and Tuluva kings were Vaishnava by faith, but worshipped at the feet of Lord Virupaksha (Shiva) at Hampi as well as Lord Venkateswara (Vishnu) at Tirupati. A Sanskrit work, Jambavati Kalyanam by King Krishnadevaraya, called Lord Virupaksha Karnata Rajya Raksha Mani ("protective jewel of Karnata Empire"). The kings patronised the saints of the dvaita order (philosophy of dualism) of Madhvacharya at Udupi.

The Bhakti (devotional) movement was active during this time, and involved well known Haridasas (devotee saints) of that time. Like the Virashaiva movement of the 12th century, this movement presented another strong current of devotion, pervading the lives of millions. The haridasas represented two groups, the Vyasakuta and Dasakuta, the former being required to be proficient in the Vedas, Upanishads and other Darshanas, while the Dasakuta merely conveyed the message of Madhvacharya through the Kannada language to the people in the form of devotional songs (Devaranamas and Kirthanas). The philosophy of Madhvacharya was spread by eminent disciples such as Naraharitirtha, Jayatirtha, Sripadaraya, Vyasatirtha, Vadirajatirtha and others. Vyasatirtha, the guru (teacher) of Vadirajatirtha, Purandaradasa (Father of Carnatic music) and Kanakadasa earned the devotion of King Krishnadevaraya. The king considered the saint his Kuladevata (family deity) and honoured him in his writings. During this time, another great composer of early carnatic music, Annamacharya composed hundreds of Kirthanas in Telugu at Tirumala – Tirupati, in present-day Andhra Pradesh.

The Vijayanagara Empire created an epoch in South Indian history that transcended regionalism by promoting Hinduism as a unifying factor. The empire reached its peak during the rule of Sri Krishnadevaraya when Vijayanagara armies were consistently victorious. The empire annexed areas formerly under the Sultanates in the northern Deccan and the territories in the eastern Deccan, including Kalinga, while simultaneously maintaining control over all its subordinates in the south. Many important monuments were either completed or commissioned during the time of Krishna Deva Raya.

Vijayanagara went into decline after the defeat in the Battle of Talikota (1565). After the death of Aliya Rama Raya in the Battle of Talikota, Tirumala Deva Raya started the Aravidu dynasty, moved and founded a new capital of Penukonda to replace the destroyed Hampi, and attempted to reconstitute the remains of Vijayanagara Empire. Tirumala abdicated in 1572, dividing the remains of his kingdom to his three sons, and pursued a religious life until his death in 1578. The Aravidu dynasty successors ruled the region but the empire collapsed in 1614, and the final remains ended in 1646, from continued wars with the Bijapur Sultanate and others. During this period, more kingdoms in South India became independent and separate from Vijayanagara. These include the Mysore Kingdom, Keladi Nayaka, Nayaks of Madurai, Nayaks of Tanjore, Nayakas of Chitradurga and Nayak Kingdom of Gingee – all of which declared independence and went on to have a significant impact on the history of South India in the coming centuries.

Mughal period 

The official state religion of Mughal India was Islam, with the preference to the jurisprudence of the Hanafi Madhhab (Mazhab). Hinduism remained under strain during Babur and Humanyun's reigns. Sher Shah Suri, the Afghan ruler of North India was comparatively non-repressive. Hinduism came to fore during the three-year rule of Hindu ruler Hemu Vikramaditya during 1553–1556 when he had defeated Akbar at Agra and Delhi and had taken up the reign from Delhi as a Hindu 'Vikramaditya' after his 'Rajyabhishake' or coronation at Purana Quila in Delhi. However, during Mughal history, at times, subjects had the freedom to practise any religion of their choice, though kafir able-bodied adult males with income were obliged to pay the jizya, which signified their status as dhimmis.

Akbar, the Mughal emperor Humayun's son and heir from his Sindhi queen Hameeda Banu Begum, had a broad vision of Indian and Islamic traditions. One of Emperor Akbar's most unusual ideas regarding religion was Din-i-Ilahi (Faith of God), which was an eclectic mix of Islam, Zoroastrianism, Hinduism, Jainism and Christianity. It was proclaimed the state religion until his death. These actions, however, met with stiff opposition from the Muslim clergy, especially the Sufi Shaykh Alf Sani Ahmad Sirhindi. Akbar's abolition of poll-tax on non-Muslims, acceptance of ideas from other religious philosophies, toleration of public worship by all religions and his interest in other faiths showed an attitude of considerable religious tolerance, which, in the minds of his orthodox Muslim opponents, were tantamount to apostasy. Akbar's imperial expansion acquired many Hindu states, many of whom were Hindu Rajputs, through vassalage. The Rajput vassals maintained semi-autonomy in running religious affairs. Many Hindu Rajput vassals built monumental Hindu temples during the period, such as Chaturbhuj Temple and Lakshmi Temple at Orchha, by the Mughal vassal, the Hindu Rajput Orchha State.

Akbar's son, Jahangir, half Rajput, was also a religious moderate, his mother being Hindu. The influence of his two Hindu queens (the Maharani Maanbai and Maharani Jagat) kept religious moderation as a centre-piece of state policy which was extended under his son, Emperor Shah Jahan, who was by blood 75% Rajput and less than 25% Moghul.

Religious orthodoxy would only play an important role during the reign of Shah Jahan's son and successor, Aurangzeb, a devout Sunni Muslim. Aurangzeb was comparatively less tolerant of other faiths than his predecessors had been; and has been subject to controversy and criticism for his policies that abandoned his predecessors' legacy of pluralism, citing his introduction of the jizya tax, doubling of custom duties on Hindus while abolishing it for Muslims, destruction of Hindu temples, forbidding construction and repairs of some non-Muslim temples, and the executions of Maratha ruler Sambhaji and the ninth Sikh guru, Guru Tegh Bahadur, and his reign saw an increase in the number and importance of Islamic institutions and scholars. He led many military campaigns against the remaining non-Muslim powers of the Indian subcontinent – the Sikh states of Punjab, the last independent Hindu Rajputs and the Maratha rebels – as also against the Shia Muslim kingdoms of the Deccan. He also virtually stamped out, from his empire, open proselytisation of Hindus and Muslims by foreign Christian missionaries, who remained successfully active, however, in the adjoining regions: the present day Kerala, Tamil Nadu and Goa. The Hindus in Konkan were helped by Marathas, Hindus in Punjab, Kashmir and North India were helped by Sikhs and Hindus in Rajasthan and Central India were helped by Rajputs.

Maratha Empire 

The Hindu Marathas had resisted incursions into the region by the Muslim Mughal rulers of northern India. Under their ambitious leader Chhatrapati Shivaji Maharaj, the Maratha freed themselves from the Muslim sultans of Bijapur to the southeast and, becoming much more aggressive, began to frequently raid Mughal territory. The Marathas had spread and conquered much of central India by Shivaji's death in 1680. Subsequently, under the able leadership of Brahmin prime ministers (Peshwas), the Maratha Empire reached its zenith; Pune, the seat of Peshwas, flowered as a centre of Hindu learning and traditions. The empire at its peak stretched from Tamil Nadu in the south, to Peshawar, present day Khyber Pakhtunkhwa ) in the north, and Bengal in the east.

Kingdom of Nepal 

King Prithvi Narayan Shah, the last Gorkhali monarch, self-proclaimed the newly unified Kingdom of Nepal as Asal Hindustan ("Real Land of Hindus") due to North India being ruled by the Islamic Mughal rulers. The proclamation was done to enforce Hindu social code Dharmaśāstra over his reign and refer to his country as being inhabitable for Hindus. He also referred Northern India as Mughlan (Country of Mughals) and called the region infiltrated by Muslim foreigners.

After the Gorkhali conquest of Kathmandu valley, King Prithvi Narayan Shah expelled the Christian Capuchin missionaries from Patan and revisioned Nepal as Asal Hindustan ("real land of Hindus"). The Hindu Tagadharis, a Nepalese Hindu socio-religious group, were given the privileged status in the Nepalese capital thereafter. Since then Hinduisation became the significant policy of the Kingdom of Nepal. Professor Harka Gurung speculates that the presence of Islamic Mughal rule and Christian British rule in India had compelled the foundation of Brahmin Orthodoxy in Nepal for the purpose building a haven for Hindus in the Kingdom of Nepal.

Early colonialism 

Portuguese missionaries had reached the Malabar Coast in the late 15th century, made contact with the St Thomas Christians in Kerala and sought to introduce the Latin Rite among them. Since the priests for St Thomas Christians were served by the Eastern Christian Churches, they were following Eastern Christian practices at that time. Throughout this period, foreign missionaries also made many new converts to Christianity. This led to the formation of the Latin Catholics in Kerala.

The Goa Inquisition was the office of the Christian Inquisition acting in the Indian city of Goa and the rest of the Portuguese empire in Asia. Francis Xavier, in a 1545 letter to John III, requested for an Inquisition to be installed in Goa. It was installed eight years after the death of Francis Xavier in 1552. Established in 1560 and operating until 1774, this highly controversial institution was aimed primarily at Hindus and wayward new converts.

The Battle of Plassey would see the emergence of the British as a political power; their rule later expanded to cover much of India over the next hundred years, conquering all of the Hindu states on the Indian subcontinent, with the exception of the Kingdom of Nepal. While the Maratha Empire remained the preeminent power in India, making it the last remaining Hindu empire, until their defeat in the Third Anglo-Maratha War which left the East India Company in control of most of India; as noted by acting Governor-General Charles Metcalfe, after surveying and analyzing the conditions in India, in 1806 wrote: "India contains no more than two great powers, British and Mahratta." During this period, Northeastern India was divided into many kingdoms, most notable being the Kingdom of Manipur, which ruled from their seat of power at Kangla Palace and developed a sophisticated Hindu Gaudiya Vaishnavism culture, later the kingdom became a princely state of the British. The Kingdom of Mysore was defeated in the Fourth Anglo-Mysore War by the British East India Company, leading to the reinstatement of the Hindu Wadiyar dynasty in Mysore as a princely states. In 1817, the British went to war with the Pindaris, raiders who were based in Maratha territory, which quickly became the Third Anglo-Maratha War, and the British government offered its protection to the mainly Hindu Rajput rulers of Rajputana from the Pindaris and the Marathas. The mainly Hindu Palaiyakkarar states emerged from the fall of the Vijayanagara Empire, and were a bastion of Hindu resistance; and managed to weather invasions and survive till the advent of the British. From 1799 to 1849, the Sikh Empire, ruled by members of the Sikh religion, emerged as the last major indigenous power in the Northwest of the Indian subcontinent under the leadership of Maharaja Ranjit Singh. After the death of Ranjit Singh, the empire weakened, alienating Hindu vassals and Wazirs, and leading to the conflict with the British East India Company, marked the downfall of the Sikh Empire, making it the last area of the Indian subcontinent to be conquered by the British. The entire subcontinent fell under British rule (partly indirectly, via princely states) following the Indian Rebellion of 1857.

Modern Hinduism (after c. 1850 CE) 

With the onset of the British Raj, the colonization of India by the British, there also started a Hindu Renaissance in the 19th century, which profoundly changed the understanding of Hinduism in both India and the west. Indology as an academic discipline of studying Indian culture from a European perspective was established in the 19th century, led by scholars such as Max Müller and John Woodroffe. They brought Vedic, Puranic and Tantric literature and philosophy to Europe and the United States. Western orientalist searched for the "essence" of the Indian religions, discerning this in the Vedas, and meanwhile creating the notion of "Hinduism" as a unified body of religious praxis and the popular picture of 'mystical India'. This idea of a Vedic essence was taken over by Hindu reform movements as the Brahmo Samaj, which was supported for a while by the Unitarian Church, together with the ideas of Universalism and Perennialism, the idea that all religions share a common mystic ground. This "Hindu modernism", with proponents like Vivekananda, Aurobindo, Rabindranath and Radhakrishnan, became central in the popular understanding of Hinduism.

Hindu revivalism 

During the 19th century, Hinduism developed a large number of new religious movements, partly inspired by the European Romanticism, nationalism, scientific racism and esotericism (Theosophy) popular at the time (while conversely and contemporaneously, India had a similar effect on European culture with Orientalism, "Hindoo style" architecture, reception of Buddhism in the West and similar). According to Paul Hacker, "the ethcial values of Neo-Hinduism stem from Western philosophy and Christianity, although they are expressed in Hindu terms."

These reform movements are summarised under Hindu revivalism and continue into the present.
 Swaminarayan establishes the Swaminarayan Sampradaya sect around 1800.
 Brahmo Samaj is a social and religious movement founded in Kolkata in 1828 by Raja Ram Mohan Roy. He was one of the first Indians to visit Europe and was influenced by western thought. He died in Bristol, England. The Brahmo Samaj movement thereafter resulted in the Brahmo religion in 1850 founded by Debendranath Tagore — better known as the father of Rabindranath Tagore.
 Ramakrishna and his pupil Swami Vivekananda led reform in Hinduism in the late 19th century. Their ideals and sayings have inspired numerous Indians as well as non-Indians, Hindus as well as non-Hindus.
 Arya Samaj ("Society of Nobles") is a Hindu reform movement in India that was founded by Swami Dayananda in 1875. He was a sannyasin (renouncer) who believed in the infallible authority of the Vedas. Dayananda advocated the doctrine of karma and reincarnation, and emphasised the ideals of brahmacharya (chastity) and sanyasa (renunciation). Dayananda claimed to be rejecting all non-Vedic beliefs altogether. Hence the Arya Samaj unequivocally condemned idolatry, animal sacrifices, ancestor worship, pilgrimages, priestcraft, offerings made in temples, the caste system, untouchability and child marriages, on the grounds that all these lacked Vedic sanction. It aimed to be a universal church based on the authority of the Vedas. Dayananda stated that he wanted 'to make the whole world Aryan', i.e. he wanted to develop missionary Hinduism based on the universality of the Vedas. To this end, the Arya Samaj started Shuddhi movement in the early 20th century to bring back to Hinduism people converted to Islam and Christianity, set up schools and missionary organisations, and extended its activities outside India.

Reception in the West 

An important development during the British colonial period was the influence Hindu traditions began to form on Western thought and new religious movements. An early champion of Indian-inspired thought in the West was Arthur Schopenhauer who in the 1850s advocated ethics based on an "Aryan-Vedic theme of spiritual self-conquest", as opposed to the ignorant drive toward earthly utopianism of the superficially this-worldly "Jewish" spirit. Helena Blavatsky moved to India in 1879, and her Theosophical Society, founded in New York in 1875, evolved into a peculiar mixture of Western occultism and Hindu mysticism over the last years of her life.

The sojourn of Swami Vivekananda to the World Parliament of Religions in Chicago in 1893 had a lasting effect. Vivekananda founded the Ramakrishna Mission, a Hindu missionary organisation still active today.

In the early 20th century, Western occultists influenced by Hinduism include Maximiani Portaz – an advocate of "Aryan Paganism" – who styled herself Savitri Devi and Jakob Wilhelm Hauer, founder of the German Faith Movement. It was in this period, and until the 1920s, that the swastika became a ubiquitous symbol of good luck in the West before its association with the Nazi Party became dominant in the 1930s.

Hinduism-inspired elements in Theosophy were also inherited by the spin-off movements of Ariosophy and Anthroposophy and ultimately contributed to the renewed New Age boom of the 1960s to 1980s, the term New Age itself deriving from Blavatsky's 1888 The Secret Doctrine.

Influential 20th-century Hindus were Ramana Maharshi, B. K. S. Iyengar, Paramahansa Yogananda, Prabhupada (founder of ISKCON), Sri Chinmoy, Swami Rama and others who translated, reformulated and presented Hinduism's foundational texts for contemporary audiences in new iterations, raising the profiles of Yoga and Vedanta in the West and attracting followers and attention in India and abroad.

Contemporary Hinduism 

Hinduism is followed by around 1.1 billion people in India. Other significant populations are found in Nepal (21.5 million), Bangladesh (13.1 million) and the Indonesian island of Bali (3.9 million). The majority of the Vietnamese Cham people also follow Hinduism, with the largest proportion in Ninh Thuận province.

Neo-Hindu movements in the West 

In modern times Smarta-views have been highly influential in both the Indian and western understanding of Hinduism via Neo-Vedanta. Vivekananda was an advocate of Smarta-views, and Radhakrishnan was himself a Smarta-Brahman. According to iskcon.org,

Influential in spreading Hinduism to a western audience were Swami Vivekananda, Paramahansa Yogananda, A. C. Bhaktivedanta Swami Prabhupada (Hare Krishna movement), Sri Aurobindo, Meher Baba, Maharishi Mahesh Yogi (Transcendental Meditation), Jiddu Krishnamurti, Sathya Sai Baba, Mother Meera, among others.

Hindutva 

In the 20th century, Hinduism also gained prominence as a political force and a source for national identity in India. With origins traced back to the establishment of the Hindu Mahasabha in the 1910s, the movement grew with the formulation and development of the Hindutva ideology in the following decades; the establishment of Rashtriya Swayamsevak Sangh (RSS) in 1925; and the entry, and later success, of RSS offshoots Jana Sangha and Bharatiya Janata Party (BJP) in electoral politics in post-independence India. Hindu religiosity plays an important role in the nationalist movement.

Besides India, the idea of Hindu nationalism and Hindutva can also be seen in the other areas with good population of Hindus, such as in Nepal, Bangladesh, Sri Lanka and Malaysia. In the modern world, the Hindu identity and nationalism is encouraged by many organisations as per their areas and territories. In India, Sangh Parivar is the umbrella organisation for most of the Hindu nationalist organisations, including that of Rashtriya Swayamsevak Sangh, Bharatiya Janata Party, Vishva Hindu Parishad, etc. The other nationalist organisations include Siva Senai (Sri Lanka), Nepal Shivsena, Rastriya Prajatantra Party, Hindu Prajatantrik Party, (Nepal) Bangabhumi (Bangladesh) and HINDRAF (Malaysia).

See also 

 Indianisation
 Greater India
 Indomania
 Indosphere
 Sanskritisation
 List of Hindu empires and dynasties
 India as major ancient great power
 Hinduism by country
 Central Asians in Ancient Indian literature
 Hinduism in Southeast Asia
 Hinduism in Arab states
 Balinese Hinduism
 Indianization of Southeast Asia
 Indianized kingdom
 History of Indian influence on Southeast Asia
 South-East Asia campaign of Rajendra Chola I
 Chola invasion of Srivijaya
 Indian influences in early Philippine polities
 History of India
 Indian religions
 Religion in India
 History of Yoga
 History of Shaivism
 History of Buddhism
Historicity of the Mahabharata

Notes 

Subnotes

References

Citations

Sources

Printed sources 

 
 
 
 
 

 
 
 
 
 
 
 
 
 
 
 
 
 
 
 
 
 
 
 
 
 

 
 
 
 
 
 
 
 
 

 
 
 
 

 
 
 
 
 
 
 

 
 
 
 
 
 
 
 
 

 
 
 
 
 
 
 
 
 
 
 

 
 
 
 
 
 
 
 
 
 
 
 
 
 

 
 
 
 
 
 
 
 
 
 
 
 
 
 
 
 ; via Internet Archive

Web sources

Further reading 

 
 Benjamin Walker Hindu World: An Encyclopaedic Survey of Hinduism, (Two Volumes), Allen & Unwin, London, 1968; Praeger, New York, 1968; Munshiram Manohar Lal, New Delhi, 1983; HarperCollins, New Delhi, 1985; Rupa, New Delhi, 2005, .

External links 

 
 
 

 
History of South Asia
History of India